Coelogyne bilamellata is a species of orchid.

bilamellata